Perseo has been borne by at least three ships of the Italian Navy and may refer to:

 , a  launched in 1905 and sunk in 1917.
 , a  launched in 1935 and sunk in 1943.
 , a  launched in 1978. Sold to Peru in 2006 and renamed Coronel Bolognesi. 

Italian Navy ship names